This is an incomplete list of University of Notre Dame Australia people, including alumni and staff.

Alumni
Fremantle Campus
Ricky Grace, Masters Degree in Educational Leadership. A former Perth Wildcats player and CEO & Director of Role Models WA - an organisation offering sport and development programs for Indigenous girls in Western Australian communities
 Graham Joseph Hill, Assoc. Professor of the University of Divinity, Principal of Stirling Theological College, and founder of The Global Church Project (Centre for the Research of Global Christianity)
Matt Keogh, Bachelor of Law and Bachelor of Arts (First Class Honours). An Australian Labor Member of the Australian House of Representatives
Ganzorig Vanchig, Master of Business Administration. A 2014 World Economic Forum Young Global Leader
Sydney Campus
 Dr Toby Kane, Bachelor of Medicine, Bachelor of Surgery. Australian Paralympic alpine skier
 Marty Roebuck, Bachelor of Medicine, Bachelor of Surgery. Former Australian rugby union footballer who represented New South Wales Waratahs and the Australian Wallabies as a fullback.

Administration

Chancellors

Vice-chancellors

References

Notre Dame Australia
 *
University of Notre Dame Australia